Zrmanja is a river in southern Lika and northern Dalmatia, Croatia.

It was known to the ancient Romans as Tedanius. The spring of Zrmanja is located in southern part of Lika under Postak - the southern peak of Pljesevica mountain, and close to south end of Velebit mountain. It is characteristic for its spring located on the bottom of very steep, almost 200 m high funnel shape rock called Misije. It flows southward through the narrow and long arable valley which encircles the southern end of Velebit through a 200-metre-deep canyon, and then turns westwards, reaches Obrovac, and after a few kilometers flows into the Adriatic Sea in the bay named Novigradsko more.

In the 1990s the Velebit area was declared a nature park. Rafting trips on Zrmanja take place in spring and autumn, while kayaks and canoes are used during low water level period of July and August.

The river was hit by an ecological disaster in December 2019  when waste from a former alumina plant was washed into the karst underground. Alkaline mud has been kept in open pools since the closure of the plant.

References

 Where is Zrmanja on map?

Rivers of Croatia
Drainage basins of the Adriatic Sea